Frank Delaney (24 October 1942 – 21 February 2017) was an Irish novelist, journalist and broadcaster. He was the author of The New York Times best-seller Ireland, the non-fiction book Simple Courage: A True Story of Peril on the Sea, and many other works of fiction, non-fiction and collections. He was born in Tipperary, Ireland.

Broadcasting career
Delaney began working as a newsreader for the Irish state radio and television network RTÉ in 1970. In the early 1970s he became a news reporter for the BBC in Dublin, and covered an intense period of violence known as the Troubles.
After five years of reporting on the violence, he moved to London to work in arts broadcasting. In 1978 he created the weekly Bookshelf programme for BBC Radio 4, which covered books, writers and the business of publishing. Over the next five-and-a-half years he interviewed over 1,400 authors, including Anthony Burgess, John Updike, Margaret Atwood, Christopher Isherwood and Stephen King. On television, Delaney wrote and presented for Omnibus, the BBC's weekly arts series. He served as the Literature Director of the Edinburgh Festival in 1980, and hosted his own talk show Frank Delaney in the early 1980s, which featured many cultural and literary personalities. Afterward, he created and presented Word of Mouth, the BBC's radio programme about language, as well as a variety of radio and television documentaries including specials on James Joyce, Robert Graves, Ernest Hemingway in Paris, and the Shakespeare industry. He presented The Book Show on the Sky News satellite channel for many years.

Writing career
Delaney's first book, James Joyce's Odyssey (1981), was well received and became a best-seller in the UK and Ireland. He wrote and presented the six-part documentary series The Celts (1987) for the BBC, and wrote the accompanying book. He subsequently wrote five books of non-fiction (including Simple Courage), ten novels (including Ireland, Venetia Kelly's Traveling Show and Tipperary), one novella, and a number of short stories. He also edited many compilations of essays and poetry.

Delaney wrote the screenplay for an adaptation of Goodbye, Mr. Chips (2002), which starred Martin Clunes and was shown on ITV in Britain, and in the Masterpiece Theatre series in the United States. His articles were published by newspapers in United States, the UK and Ireland, including on the Op-ed pages of The New York Times. He was a frequent public speaker, and was a contributor and guest on National Public Radio (NPR) programmes.

On Bloomsday 2010, Delaney launched Re:Joyce, a series of short weekly podcasts that go page-by-page through James Joyce's Ulysses, discussing its allusions, historical context and references. These are housed on www.frankdelaney.com.

Delaney lived in Ireland, England and the USA. He was married firstly to Eilish Kelliher, with whom he had three sons, Frank, Bryan and Owen. He subsequently was married to Susan Collier, Salley Vickers, and Diane Meier respectively.

Bibliography

Fiction
 The Last Storyteller (2012, Random House)
 The Matchmaker of Kenmare (2011, Random House)
 Venetia Kelly's Traveling Show (2010, Random House)
 Shannon, A Novel (2009, Random House)
 Tipperary, A Novel (2007, Random House)
 Ireland, A Novel (2005, HarperCollins & Time Warner)
 At Ruby's (2001, HarperCollins)
 Jim Hawkins and the Curse of Treasure Island (2001, Orion)
 Pearl (1999, HarperCollins)
 Desire and Pursuit (1998, HarperCollins)
 A Stranger in their Midst (1995, HarperCollins)
 Telling the Pictures (1994, HarperCollins)
 The Sins of the Mothers (1992, HarperCollins)
 My Dark Rosaleen (1989, CenturyHutchinson)
 The Amethysts (1977, HarperCollins)

Non-fiction
 Undead (2011, RosettaBooks)
 Simple Courage: A True Story of Peril on the Sea (2006, Random House)
 A Walk to the Western Isles: After Boswell and Johnson (1993, HarperCollins)
 Legends of the Celts (1989, Hodder & Stoughton)
 A Walk in the Dark Ages (1988, HarperCollins)
 The Celts (1986, Hodder & Stoughton)
 Betjeman Country (1983, Hodder & Stoughton)
 James Joyce's Odyssey (1981, Hodder & Stoughton)

Collections
 The Folio Society/Hutchinson Book of Essays (1990, Folio Society & CenturyHutchinson)
 The Folio Book of Irish Short Stories (1999, Folio Society)
 The Poems of Christy Brown
 The Landleaguers by Anthony Trollope (Folio Society)
 Short Stories from the Strand (Folio Society)
 The Novels of James Kennaway
 The Go-Between by L.P. Hartley (Folio Society)
 Kidnapped by Robert Louis Stevenson (Folio Society)
 Caitriona by Robert Louis Stevenson (1988, Folio Society)
 Silver Apples, Golden Apples; Best Loved Irish Verse (1987, Blackstaff Press)

Screenplays
 Goodbye, Mr. Chips (2003, from the James Hilton book, directed by Stuart Orme. Aired on ITV in London and Masterpiece Theatre)
 Across the River and into the Trees (2001, from the Ernest Hemingway novella, for Working Title Television, London, not produced)
 Telling the Pictures (1995, from Delaney's own novel, under option with Spikings Entertainment, Los Angeles)
 My Dark Rosaleen (1993, From Delaney's own novella, endowed by the European Script Fund)

Podcasts
 Re:Joyce, weekly podcast on James Joyce's "Ulysses" (2010–2017, planned until 2026, www.frankdelaney.com)

References

1942 births
2017 deaths
BBC newsreaders and journalists
BBC Radio 4 presenters
BBC television presenters
Irish broadcasters
Irish journalists
Irish non-fiction writers
Irish male non-fiction writers
20th-century Irish novelists
Irish screenwriters
Irish male short story writers
James Joyce scholars
People from County Tipperary
RTÉ newsreaders and journalists
Sky News
The New York Times people
20th-century Irish short story writers
21st-century Irish novelists
21st-century Irish short story writers
Irish male novelists